Tessmannianthus quadridomius is a species of plant in the family Melastomataceae. It is endemic to Colombia.

Its name refers to botanist José Cuatrecasas: "quadridomius" is Latin for "cuatre casas".

References

quadridomius
Endemic flora of Colombia
Endangered plants
Taxonomy articles created by Polbot